Saná Gomes (born 10 October 1999) is a Bissau-Guinean professional footballer who plays as a left-back for Bulgarian club Beroe Stara Zagora on loan from the Hungarian side Debrecen, and the Guinea-Bissau national team.

Club career
Gomes is a youth product of the academies of Fontainhas, Estoril, Chaves, and Leiria. He began his senior career with Leiria in 2016. He moved to Braga in 2017, and had short loan stints with Montalegre and 1º Dezembro before moving to Sertanense in 2019. He moved to Armenia with Noah in 2020. Gomes made his professional debut with Noah in a 4–2 Armenian Premier League win over Pyunik on 7 March 2020.

On 30 January 2023, Saná joined Beroe Stara Zagora in Bulgaria on loan until the end of the 2022–23 season.

International career
Gomes debuted with Guinea-Bissau in a friendly 3–0 win over Equatorial Guinea on 23 March 2022.

Honour
Noah
 Armenian Cup: 2019–20
 Armenian Supercup: 2020

References

External links
 

1999 births
Sportspeople from Bissau
Living people
Bissau-Guinean footballers
Guinea-Bissau international footballers
Association football fullbacks
U.D. Leiria players
S.C. Braga players
C.D.C. Montalegre players
S.U. 1º Dezembro players
Sertanense F.C. players
FC Noah players
Debreceni VSC players
PFC Beroe Stara Zagora players
Campeonato de Portugal (league) players
Armenian Premier League players
Nemzeti Bajnokság I players
First Professional Football League (Bulgaria) players
Bissau-Guinean expatriate footballers
Expatriate footballers in Portugal
Bissau-Guinean expatriate sportspeople in Portugal
Expatriate footballers in Armenia
Bissau-Guinean expatriate sportspeople in Armenia
Expatriate footballers in Hungary
Bissau-Guinean expatriate sportspeople in Hungary
Expatriate footballers in Bulgaria
Bissau-Guinean expatriate sportspeople in Bulgaria